Lutter or Lütter may refer to:

Places in France:
Lutter, Haut-Rhin, a commune in the Haut-Rhin department

Places in Germany:
Lutter am Barenberge, a municipality in the Goslar district, Lower Saxony
Lutter am Barenberge (Samtgemeinde), a collective municipality in the Goslar district, Lower Saxony
Lutter, Thuringia, a municipality in the Eichsfeld district, Thuringia
Lutter, a locality of Neustadt am Rübenberge in the Hanover area, Lower Saxony

Rivers in Germany:
Lutter (Aa), headwater stream of the Aa in North Rhine-Westphalia
Lutter (Ems), tributary of the Ems in North Rhine-Westphalia
Lutter (Frieda), tributary of the Frieda in Thuringia
Lutter (Lachte), tributary of the Lachte in Lower Saxony
Lutter (Leine), tributary of the Leine in Göttingen, Lower Saxony
Lutter (Oder), tributary of the Oder in Lower Saxony
Grade Lutter, headstream of this Lutter
Krumme Lutter, headstream of this Lutter
Lutter (Schunter), tributary of the Schunter in Lower Saxony
Lütter, tributary of the Fulda in Hesse

People:
Alfred Lutter (born 1962), American former child actor
Howard Lutter (1889–1959), American musician and composer best known for creation of player piano rolls
Lilian G. Lutter, British educationist who spent most part of her career in India
Parke Lutter, fashion designer (Parke & Ronen)
Travis Lutter (born 1973), American mixed martial arts fighter
Vera Lutter (born 1960), New York-based artist

Other uses:
 Lutter (TV series), Germany 2007–2010

Surnames from given names